Yakaya is an outdoor 2010 sculpture by Troy Pillow, installed in Riverbend Park, along Columbia Street, in Bend, Oregon, United States. The painted stainless steel artwork is constructed from nine kayaks and measures  x  x .

See also

 2010 in art
 List of public art in Bend, Oregon

References

External links
 

2010 establishments in Oregon
2010 sculptures
Culture of Bend, Oregon
Outdoor sculptures in Oregon
Stainless steel sculptures in Oregon